Khailshanker Durlabhji  (15 November 1912 – 13 February 1992)  was a notable jeweller from Jaipur city in Rajasthan state in India. He was awarded the Padma Shri by the Government of India for his promotion of trade and contributions to medical services in Rajasthan.

References

Businesspeople from Jaipur
Rajasthani people
Indian jewellers
Recipients of the Padma Shri in trade and industry
1912 births
1992 deaths